David Sandan Abagna (born 9 September 1998) is a Ghanaian  professional footballer who plays as a midfielder for Sudan Premier League club Al-Hilal Club.

He previously played for Ghana Premier league sides Ashanti Gold, Wa All stars and Real Tamale United. He won his first league title in his debut season with Wa All Stars in 2016.

Career

Early life and career 
Abagna was born in Tamale in the Northern Region of Ghana. He started his career with Tamale based team Zaytuna Babies. He later moved to Wa All Stars FC in 2016 ahead of the 2016 Ghana premier league season.

Wa All stars

2016 season 
Abagna moved from Zaytuna in 2016 to then Ghana Premier League team Wa All stars now Legon Cities. He won the league in his debut season and was a member of the squad that won the 2016 Ghanaian Premier League. He made his debut that season on 13 August 2018 against Ebusua Dwarfs being named on the starting line up for the match. He played 57 minutes and was later substituted for Samuel Atta Mensah. The match ended in a 1–0 home loss. He was named on 6 team sheets but made 4 appearances within the season as the club won the league title.

2017 season 
The following season, the  2017 season, he made all 30 league appearances and scored 13 goals. With 13 goals he finished the season as joint 3rd top goalscorer along with Thomas Abbey of Accra Hearts of Oak and Ahmed Touré of Bechem United F.C., trailing by 4 goals to eventual top scorer Hans Kwofie of Ashanti Gold. He also featured in the 2017 CAF Champions League for the club. He also played a crucial role during the 2017 Ghana FA Cup by scoring 4 goals as his side reached the semi-finals before losing to Hearts of Oak. In January 2018, he was nominated for the 2017 SWAG Most Promising Star of the Year. In May 2018, he beat competition from Ghanaian weightlifter Richmond Osafo to win the award.

2018 season 
In the 2018 season, he made 9 league appearances and scored 2 goals before the league was abandoned due to the dissolution of the GFA in June 2018, as a result of the Anas Number 12 Expose. By the time he left the club he had made 45 league appearances and scored 15 goals.

Ashanti Gold 
In July 2019, he was signed by Ashanti Gold on a 3-year contract ahead of the 2019–20 Ghana Premier League. He made 11 league appearances before the league was abandoned and later cancelled due to the COVID-19 pandemic. He featured for the Obuasi-based club in the 2020–21 CAF Confederation Cup qualifying rounds match against Burkinabe club Salitas FC. He scored a goal in the second leg of the match but Ashanti Gold lost 2–1. He scored a brace in the 2020–21 Ghana Premier League on 19 February 2021, in a match against Aduana Stars, which eventually ended in a 4–0 win.

Real Tamale United 
In 2021 Abagna signed for childhood and hometown team Real Tamale United on a three-year deal with Ashanti Kotoko losing on securing his signature after they wrote to Ashanti Gold to express their interest in signing him. He started his career for the Tamale-based club on a high flying note, scoring five goals in his first three games for the club. In the team's first premier league in seven years Abagna scored at home to help RTU dra 1 - 1 with Accra Great Olympics. The Player scored a brace in a 3 - 2 defeat away to Legon Cities FC before scoring another two goals on November 14, 2021, home encounter to help RTU clinch their first win against West Africa Football Academy(WAFA). On Sunday December 5, 2021, David Abagna Sandan scored in stoppage to give RTU a dramatic victory away from home against Berekum Chelsea at the Golden City Park in Berekum. Before departing for the Africa Cup of Nations in Cameroon, he scored 8 goals for RTU.

International career 
In July 2017 at the age of 17 years, Abagna received a late call up into the Ghana A' national football team, ahead of the 2018 CHAN qualifiers.

Personal life 
In 2018, Abagna enrolled in the University for Development Studies, to pursue a diploma in Education.

Honours 
Wa All Stars

 Ghana Premier League: 2016
 Ghana Super Cup: 2017
Ashanti Gold

 Ghanaian FA Cup runner up: 2020–21
Individual
 SWAG Most Promising Star of the Year: 2017
 Ghana FA Cup Most Promising Player: 2017

References

External links 
 
 

Living people
1998 births
Legon Cities FC players
Ghanaian footballers
Association football midfielders
Ashanti Gold SC players
People from Tamale, Ghana
Ghana Premier League players
Ghana international footballers
Real Tamale United players
Ghana A' international footballers
2022 African Nations Championship players